Catfish Blues is a 2016 American independent film written by Michael Worth and directed by Junior Bonner. It stars Max Tadman and Worth's grandmother Lois Stewart as a pair of friends who spend a summer searching for lost animals in a Northern California town. The film also features veteran actor Tim Thomerson.

Produced by Worth's production company Grizzly Peak Films, Catfish Blues premiered at the 2016 Big Island Film Festival, where it won the Best Family Film and Audience Choice Feature Award.

References

External links

2016 films
American independent films
2016 comedy films
Films shot in Los Angeles
Films shot in California
2010s English-language films
2010s American films